Bothel may refer to:

 Bothel, Cumbria in England
 Bothel, Lower Saxony in Germany
 Bothel (Samtgemeinde), a collective municipality around the German village Bothel
 Bothell, Washington in the United States